Interstate 55 (I-55) in the US state of Missouri runs from the Arkansas state line to the Poplar Street Bridge over the Mississippi River in St. Louis.

Route description
I-55 enters Missouri at the Arkansas border near Cooter. It runs northward through mostly flat land in the Bootheel, where it has an interchange with U.S. Route 412 (US 412) and I-155. The highway continues over bumpy land through or near the towns of Hayti, Portageville, and New Madrid before reaching an interchange with US 60 and I-57 just south of Sikeston. The next interchange, US 62, provides access into the city of Sikeston and one of its most popular attractions, Lambert's Cafe, the "Home of the Throwed Rolls".

North of Sikeston, I-55 begins to traverse rolling terrain on its way to Cape Girardeau. Exit 95, Route 74 east, provides direct access to the Bill Emerson Memorial Bridge into southern Illinois. The heart of the city of Cape Girardeau as well as Southeast Missouri State University can be reached by taking either exit 96 or exit 99.

I-55 then goes through rural areas again as it makes a north-northwesterly run through the towns of Perryville and Ste. Genevieve before entering the southern reaches of the St. Louis metro area at the interchange with US 67 and the Twin Cities of Festus and Crystal City. US 61 and US 67 run concurrently immediately east of I-55 nearly due north through the Jefferson County towns of Herculaneum, Pevely (where the Interstate expands from four lanes to six), Barnhart (and then to eight), Imperial, and finally Arnold before crossing the Meramec River into St. Louis County.

From Richardson Road in Arnold to I-270, I-55 is 10 lanes wide. The Interstate narrows back down to eight lanes past I-270, through southern St. Louis County, and into the city of St. Louis. In the last few miles of I-55 in the state of Missouri, there is an interchange and brief overlap with I-44 before reaching the Poplar Street Bridge crossing into Illinois.

History

Sponsorship controversy
The white supremacy group Ku Klux Klan began fighting several court battles with the state of Missouri after the state disputed its right to sponsor a stretch of freeway in Saint Louis County and Jefferson County, near St. Louis. In March 2001, after a US District Court judge found that blocking the Klan's sponsorship was unconstitutional, the Court of Appeals ruled that the state must erect signs announcing the group's sponsorship. However, the Missouri Legislature later voted to rename the stretch of I-55 the "Rosa Parks Freeway" in honor of the Montgomery civil rights hero who began the Montgomery bus boycott. When asked how she felt about this honor, she is reported to have commented, "It is always nice to be thought of." The Klan were eventually dropped from the scheme on April 4, 2001, on the grounds that, for the duration of their sponsorship, they had not once cleaned the freeway.

Exit list

Auxiliary routes
: A spur running from I-55 in Hayti, Missouri, to US 51 in Dyersburg, Tennessee; overlaps with US 412 for its entire length.  of this highway will be absorbed into the newly extended I-69 in the future.
: The eastern third of the beltway around the St. Louis Metro Area (with I-270 forming the remaining two-thirds)
: I-55 has three business loops in Missouri.

References

External links

 The Name Game, at Snopes.com.

55
 Missouri
Roads in Greater St. Louis
Transportation in Pemiscot County, Missouri
Transportation in New Madrid County, Missouri
Transportation in Scott County, Missouri
Transportation in Cape Girardeau County, Missouri
Transportation in Perry County, Missouri
Transportation in Ste. Genevieve County, Missouri
Transportation in Jefferson County, Missouri
Transportation in St. Louis County, Missouri